The Xingu-Estreito UHVDC transmission line is a 2076 km long 800 kV high-voltage direct current transmission line in Brazil between the Xingu substation at the city of Anapu in the Pará state, 17 km from the Belo Monte Dam, and the Estreito substation at the city of Ibiraci in the Minas Gerais state. It was inaugurated 21 December 2017.

See also

 Xingu-Rio HVDC transmission line

References

Electric power infrastructure in Brazil
HVDC transmission lines
Energy infrastructure completed in 2017
2017 establishments in Brazil